Cricket 2007 may refer to: 
 Cricket 07, a 2006 video game published by EA Sports.
 The 2007 Cricket World Cup, the 2007 edition of the Cricket World Cup, held in the West Indies.
2007 ICC World Twenty20, the inaugural Twenty20 World Cup